Leptinotarsa texana, the Texas potato beetle, is a species of leaf beetle in the family Chrysomelidae. It is found in Africa, Central America, and North America.

References

Further reading

External links

 

Chrysomelinae
Articles created by Qbugbot
Beetles described in 1906